Maja Briaset is a  tall mountain located in the country of Albania. It is part of the Accursed Mountains range in the northern part of Albania. One of the surrounding valleys is Valbona Valley.

References

Mountains of Albania
Accursed Mountains